Saufley may refer to:

Saufley Field, a military airport west of Pensacola, in Escambia County, Florida, United States
, a Fletcher-class destroyer, was a ship of the United States Navy named for Lieutenant Richard Saufley

People with the surname
Leigh Saufley (born 1954), the Chief Justice of the Maine Supreme Judicial Court
Richard C. Saufley (1884–1916), pioneer of naval aviation in the United States Navy

See also
Safely
Satley
Sawfly
Sawley (disambiguation)